Vadim Andreyevich Bogdanov (born 26 March 1986) is a Russian handball player for KS Azoty-Puławy and the Russian national team.

References

1986 births
Living people
Sportspeople from Saint Petersburg
Russian male handball players
Expatriate handball players in Poland
Russian expatriate sportspeople in Belarus
Russian expatriate sportspeople in Poland